William Laurel Harris (February 18, 1870 – September 24, 1924) was an American muralist, educator, editor, and arts organizer.

Harris was a member of the Municipal Art Society (of which he was president in 1912), the Architectural League of New York (of which he was vice president), The National Mural Painters Society, and The Fine Arts Federation; he also founded the Art Centre with Katherine Dreier. He painted murals, designed the decorative elements, and continued the work of John LaFarge at the Church of Saint Paul the Apostle (also known as the Paulist Fathers Church) on 59th Street and 9th Avenue, New York City. The church was called "an experiment in democracy in American art" by the order's founder, Isaac Thomas Hecker. Other contributors to its decoration include Augustus Saint-Gaudens, Stanford White, Frederick William MacMonnies, and Bela Pratt.

Harris labored on this project for 15 years, from 1898 to 1913 until fired by the Paulists in what appears to have been a personal dispute. A disastrous "cleaning" in 1958 removed fourteen of Harris's Saints on side chapel walls, much of Harris's unique ornamentation, and his color treatment. A renovation in the 1990s did not restore any of Harris's decorative painting, but did preserve many of his most important works, including a nativity scene, the Virgin Mary Enthroned, St. Patrick's and St. Catherine's altars, "The Precious Blood", a carved and painted frieze featuring lambs, a memorial to deceased Paulists, and a  crucifixion.

Boyhood and education 

 
Harris was born in Brooklyn, New York, to Henry and Julia (Gillingham) Harris. Orphaned in Brooklyn at age 4, Harris was raised by his grandmother in Windsor, Vermont. He there met Augustus Saint-Gaudens, Maxfield Parrish, Stephen Parrish; and began his studies with T.W. Dewing.

Harris traveled to Boston and studied with Dewing at the School of the Museum of Fine Arts, Boston. At age 17 he was Dewing's monitor at the Art Students League in New York City.

The next year Harris studied art at Académie Julian, Paris with, among others, Paul Gauguin and at École des Beaux-Arts where he became massier under Jean-Léon Gérôme. While in Paris Harris pursued his lifelong interest in the applied arts while in Paris, studying, and perhaps working, at the Gobelin Tapestry Works.

The Paulist fathers

The Paulists (Society of St. Paul the Apostle) were the first order in the Roman Catholic Communion founded in the United States. Featuring works by John LaFarge, Stanford White, Frederick MacMonnies, Bela Pratt, Paulist leader Isaac Hecker wished the church edifice at 59th Street and 9th Avenue in Manhattan to be "an experiment in Democracy in American art." In the 1890s, William Laurel Harris began, under Father George Deshon, decoration of the church. He would work and live with the Paulists until 1913, taking over from John LaFarge not only the mural paintings of Saints and Parables, but the "complete decorative scheme" of the massive edifice.

Other murals 

Along with his work for the Paulist Fathers Harris's other work included paintings and color schemes in the church of St. Nicholas of the Children in Pasaic, NJ, a Dominican Monastery in Hunts Point, NY, Catholic Club of New York, as well as outdoor murals and chapels at Lake George, NY.

Among his educational work was the founding of an "art and trades school" in New York City called the Art Centre.  He also trained younger painters as assistants during his projects. Harris himself had been an assistant to Edwin Howland Blashfield during the painting of the dome of Library of Congress in Washington, D.C. He also wrote editorials for the New York Times and was editor of Good Furniture, a magazine of home decor.

He was president of Municipal Art Society at the time of the historic 1916 city zoning resolution.

William Laurel Harris died at age 54 at his studio adjacent to the Paulist Fathers retreat at Lake George, New York, of a stroke. He is buried in Windsor, Vermont.

Writer and editor

Harris's first articles on church decoration appear in ecclesiastical publications in 1903. He wrote book reviews for the New York Times, compiled a published catalog of murals in the United States for the Fine Arts Federation and, for over 11 years, was contributing editor for Good Furniture magazine.

References and citations 

Ahlstrom, Sidney. Religious History of the American People, New Haven, 1973.
The American Renaissance 1876-1917. Exhibition Catalogue, Brooklyn Museum, 1979.
Anthony, Wilfred E. "The Church of St. Paul the Apostle, New York". Christian Art, 3. June, 1908. pp. 101–117.
Archives of American Art. NMc7. Macbeth Gallery Papers, 224–225.
——, Century Magazine collection, letters from Harris to Robert Sterling Yard, ed.
——, :15. Municipal Art Society, 1–9.
——, :P10. Philadelphia Archives of American Art. Philadelphia Museum of Art, 695.
"Artist Devoting Twenty-Five Years to Paintings for a Church". Hampton's Magazine, 23. October, 1909. pp 557–8.
"Art: Exhibition of Paintings". New York Times, October 24, 1920, Sec. 6, p. 8. col. 1–2.
"Art Notes." Art Interchange, 33. August, 1894. 45.
"Ba-Relief Is Blessed At St. Paul the Apostle." Herald Tribune, December 8, 1958.
Blashfield, Edwin Howland. Mural Painting in America, New York, 1913.
Catalogue de Luxe of the Department of Fine Arts. Panama-Pacific International Exposition. 2 vols. San Francisco: Paul Elder and Co., [1915].
Catalogue of the Annual Exhibition of the Architectural League of New York. New York, 1899–1924.
"A Center of Art and Architecture." The Midtowner, 2, No. 1 (March 8, 1893), 1.
"The Church of St. Paul the Apostle." The Paulist Calendar, 12, No. 3 (February, 1935), 6–7.
Church of St. Paul the Apostle, New York: Photographs of the Church. [New York]: Paulist Fathers, [1932].
"Church of Saint Paul the Apostle." The Paulist News, 2, No. 8 (July, 1939), 1–2.
"Church Reconstruction Under Novel Conditions." Harper's Weekly, 33 (April 5, 1890), 267–268.
Crowninshield, Frederic. Mural Painting. Boston: Ticknor and Co., 1887.
ibid., A Painter's Moods. New York: Dodd, Mead and Co., 1902.
"The Dedication of the Church of St. Paul the Apostle in New York." Catholic World, 40 (March, 1885), 836–42.
Dillenberger, Jane and Joshua C. Taylor. The Hand and the Spirit: Religious Art In America 1700–1900. Berkeley: University Art Museum, 1972.
Dorr, Charles H. "A Study in Church Decoration." Architectural Record, 33, No. 3 (March, 1913), 187–212.
"Elizabeth of Hungary (Thuringia), St." New Catholic Encyclopaedia. (1967).
Elliot, Walter. The Life of Father Hecker. New York: Columbus Press, 1894.
Farina, John. An American Experience of God: The Spirituality of Isaac Hecker. New York: Paulist Press, 1981.
Fleck, Hattie C. "A Paulist Shrine to Saint Therese of Lisieux." The Little Flower Magazine, October, 1947, 14–15.
"For Billboard Reforms: Municipal Art Society to Hold Symposium On Oct. 8." New York Times, September 27, 1913, p. 12.
Fosdick, J. William. "The Architectural League of New York." International Studio, 55 (April, 1915), XXIII-XXVI.
"The Founders of the Paulist Fathers and the Parish of Saint Paul." The Paulist News, 2, No. 6 (May, 1939), n. p.
"Four Cathedralesque Churches in New York." Vanity Fair, January, 1916, 61.
Good Furniture. magazine. (Harris as contributing editor).  1913–1924.
"The Great Crucifix." The Calendar, 13, No. 2 (November, 1898),
Handy, Robert T. History of the Churches in the United States and Canada. New York: Oxford University Press, 1977. 36
Hanley, Boniface. "In the American Tradition." The Anthonian, 57. 4th Quarter. 1983. pp. 3–28.
Harris, William Laurel. An Account of a Carved and Painted Doorway in the Paulist Church. [New York]: n.p., n.d.*
——., "The Bodega of Corpus Christi." Good Furniture. 4 (January, 1915) 213–217.
——., "Church Building and Decoration in America." Art and Progress, 2 (December, 1910), 33–39.
——., "Byzantine Furniture and Fabrics in Italian Church Mosaics and Ivory Carvings." Good Furniture, 8 (January, 1917), 27–39.
——., "The Decoration of the Paulist Church." Art and Progress, 2 (April, 1911), 169–174.
——., "Ecclesiastical Furniture: Gothic Ideals in Carving and Cabinet Making." Good Furniture, 6 (March, 1916), 137–147.
——., "The Foreign Aspect of Mural Painting." The Craftsman, 6 (September, 1904), 527–540.
——., "The Guilds—A Study in the Spirit of Industry." Good Furniture, 4 (December, 1917), 149–154. .
——., "Handsomest of All Public Schools." Boston Evening Transcript, June 6, 1914, n.p., Archives of American Art, N55, Art Division Scrapbooks, New York Public Library, 237.
——., "Industrial Art Opportunity of America." Good Furniture, 4 (October, 1914), 1–2.
——., "Industrial Arts."' Letter. New York Times, February 26, 1922, Sec. 2, p. 4.
——., "Machinery as the Servant of Art." Review of Art In Industry, by Charles R. Richards. New York Times, January 7, 1923, Sec. 3, p. 11.
——., "The Mystery of Silver," International Studio, 79 (September, 1924), 388–92.
——., "A Modern Guild of Artists." Catholic World, 76 (January, 1903), 436–42.
——., Foreword, "Mural Painting in the United States, American Art Annual, 9 (1911), 13.
——, "Mural Art School," The New York Herald, 9 Nov., 1913;III;9;5 [describing The Art Centre]
——., "A Pentaptych by J. W. Fosdick." International Studio, 56 (July, 1915), XVIII-XXI. "A Remarkable e Exhibition of Cretonnes and Chintzes". Good Furniture, 11. December, 1918. 271–286.
——., "Stained Glass Windows: Their Mystery and Romance, Their Place in American Decorative Art." Good Furniture, 9 (October, 1917), 256–266.
——., "St. Francis of Assisi and His Influence on Church Building and Decoration." Christian Art, 3 (August, 1908), 193–203.
——., "Seen in New York." Good Furniture, 5 (November, 1915), 319–327.
"Harris, William Laurel." National 'Cyclopaedia of American Biography. (1967).
"Harris, William Laurel." Thieme-Becker. (1968).
"Harris, William Laurel." Who's Who in America. 11 (1920–21).
"Harris, William Laurel." "Who's Who in Art," American Art Annual, 16 (1919) and 18 (1921).
Hecker, Isaac T. The Aspiration of Nature. New York: J.B. Kirker, 1857.
ibid., The Questions of the Soul, New York: D. Appleton and Co., 1855.
Holden, Vincent. The Early Years of Isaac Thomas Hecker. Washington, D. C.: Catholic University of America Press, 1939.
ibid., The Yankee Paul. Milwaukee, Wisconsin: Bruce Publishing Company, 1958.
"Improvements." The Calendar, 11 (April, 1897), 1.
Isham, Samuel. The History of American Painting. New York, 1905. New ed., with supplemental chapters by Royal Cortissoz, New York, 1927.
Journal of the Paulist Fair of 1882, I (November 26, 1882).
ibid., of 1884, II (November 21, 1884).
Kennedy, Roger G. American Churches. New York: Stewart, Tabori and Chang Publishers, Inc., 1982.
Kobbe, Gustav. "New Methods in Church Decoration." New York Herald, Easter Section, April 9, 1911, p. 7
Library of Congress Mural Paintings In the Colors of the Originals, New York- Foster and Reynolds, 1902.
Joseph Maloy, C. S. P., The Church of St. Paul the Apostle in New York, n.d. "The Paulist Press, New York, N. Y." Compared with Rev. ___ Riley, C. S. P., uncataloged ms. Office of Paulist History and Archives, St. Paul's College, Washington, D. C.
"Novel Scheme Of William Laurel Harris For The Decoration Of The Dominican Chapel At Hunts Point ... " The New York Times, Sunday, 23 Aug., 1914, mag. sec., *"At Home and Abroad," p. __.
Office of Paulist History and Archives, Paulist Fathers Archives, St. Pauls College, Washington, D. C.
Paulist Father's History, Almost A Century Old Is Replete With Romance. The United News Letter, 6 (December 15, 1927), 1011, 14.
"A Plan and Description of the Church of St. Paul the Apostle." [New York: Missionary Society of St. Paul the Apostle], n.d.
The Quest for Unity: American Art Between World s Fairs 1876- 1893. Ex. Cat. Detroit Institute of Arts, 1983.
The Register of the Paulist Fathers. [New York]: n.p., 1983.
Rider, Fremont Rider's New York City: A Guide Book for Travelers. New York: Henry Holt and Company, 1923.
Roth, Leland M. "The Urban Architecture of McKim, Mead and White: 1870-1910." Diss. Yale University, 1973.
"St. Ann's Altar." The Calendar, 7 (April, 1897), 29.
"Saint Paul the Apostle Church." The Paulist News, 2, no. 7 (June, 1939), n. p.
Scott, Joseph. A Century and More of Reaching Out. An Historical Sketch of the Parish of St. Paul the Apostle, New York. The Missionary Society of St. Paul the Apostle in the State of New York, 1983.
Shea, John Dawson Gilmary, ed. The Catholic Churches of New York City, with Sketches of Their History and Lives of the Present Pastors. New York: Lawrence G. Goulding and Co., 1878.
Uhlrich, Eugenie. "LaFarge and Religious Art in America," The Rosary Magazine, 14, no. 3 (September, 1901), 210–225.
Van Renssalaer, M[ariana] G[riswold]. "Recent Architecture in American Churches." Century, 29 (January, 1885), 335–36.
"The World of Art: Art and Industries," New York Times Book Review and Magazine, October 31, 1920, 20.
Weinberg, H. Barbara. The Lure of Beauty. New York:__, 19__.
Weinberg, Helene Barbara. The Decorative Work of John Lafarge. Diss. [New York]: Garland Press, 1977.
——,  "John LaFarge and the Decoration of Trinity Church, Boston," Journal of the Society of Architectural Historians, 33 (December, 1974), 323–353.
——., "LaFarge's Eclectic Idealism in Three New York City Churches," Winterthur Portfolio, 10 (1975), 199–228.
——., "The Work of John LaFarge in the Church of St. Paul the Apostle," The American Art Journal, 6 (May, 1974), 18–34.
"William Laurel Harris." The New York Times, July 7, 1924, p. 15.
ibid., American Art Annual, vol., 1924, American Federation of the Arts, Washington, D. C.
William Laurel Harris, Will and Inventory of William Laurel Harris, New York County Surrogates Court, docket, Liber 1267, page 61.
Woodall, Helen, "The Genesis of An Ecclesiastical Structure: Hecker, LaFarge and Harris at Saint Paul the Apostle." Paper presented for Professor H. Barbara Weinberg, Gilded Age Seminar, City University of New York, New York, 1985

Copies of his published work, clippings, some letters and further biographical research can be see at The Main Street Museum, White River Jct., Vermont.

1870 births
1924 deaths
19th-century American painters
American male painters
20th-century American painters
Artists from Vermont
American muralists
People from Windsor, Vermont
American alumni of the École des Beaux-Arts
Académie Julian alumni
Burials in Vermont
Artists from Brooklyn
People from Lake George, New York
Catholic painters
19th-century American male artists
20th-century American male artists